Koguva is a village on the Estonian island of Muhu. Administratively it belongs to the Muhu Parish, Saare County. In 2000 Koguva had a population of 30.

Koguva was first mentioned in 1532 by Wolter von Plettenberg in document to grant freedom for peasant called Hansken and his son and their descendants. Hansken descendants became called by the surname Schmuul later.

Koguva is a small, rural village. There are many buildings that are centuries old, dating back to feudal times under Swedish rule, and are still in use today. The northern shore of Muhu, which is claimed to have the clearest water anywhere in the Baltic Sea, is only a short distance away. Koguva offers two bigger countryside places of accommodation right next to each other and some smaller places too.

Writer Juhan Smuul (1922–1971) was born in Koguva and owned his father's farm there until his death. He was a descendant of Hansken but used a simpler surname later in his life. Juhan Smuul's museum was in Koguva from 1970's and has been converted to Muhu Museum in the 1990s.

Gallery

References

External links

Koguva village society 
Koguva Harbour
Muhu Museum
360° Panorama of Koguva
Pärdi Guesthouse
Vanatoa Recreational Farm

Villages in Saare County